Greenhouse is the eighth studio album of the American jazz group Yellowjackets, released in 1991. In this album, the group was a trio. Bob Mintzer, who became an official member on the next album, was credited as a guest artist. The album reached a peak position of number one on Billboard Top Contemporary Jazz Albums chart.

Track listing

Personnel 

Yellowjackets
 Russell Ferrante –  keyboards
 Jimmy Haslip – bass
 Will Kennedy – drums

Additional musicians
 Bob Mintzer – tenor saxophone, soprano saxophone, bass clarinet, alto flute, EWI
 Steve Croes – Synclavier (digital music workstation)
 Alex Acuña – percussions
 Judd Miller – EWI programming (9)
 Stuart Canin – violin solo (9)
 Bill Gable – vocals (8)

Orchestra (tracks 2, 4 & 9)
 Vince Mendoza – arrangements and conductor 
 Sandy de Crescent – contractor
 Michael O'Donovan – bassoon
 Gary Gray and James Kanter – clarinet 
 James Walker – flute
 John Cooke, Dane Little, Judith Perett and David Speltz – cello
 Timothy Barr and Arni Egglison – double bass 
 Brian Dembow, Pamela Goldsmith, Dan Neufeld and Mihail Zinovyev – viola
 Arnold Belnick, Stuart Canin, Bruce Dukov, Clayton Haslop, Bill Hybel, Karen Jones, Kathleen Lenski, Irma Neuman, Anatoly Rosinsky, Sheldon Sanov, Polly Sweeney and Dorothy Wade – violin

Production 
 Yellowjackets – producers
 Jan Erik Kongshaug – engineer, mixing 
 Ken Allardyce – assistant engineer
 Joseph Doughney – post-production engineer
 Michael Landy – post-production engineer
 Stephen Marcussen – mastering 
 Michelle Lewis – production coordinator 
 Andy Baltimore – creative director
 David Gibb – creative director
 Scott Johnson – graphic design 
 Sonny Mediana – graphic design 
 Andy Ruggirello – graphic design 
 Dan Serrano – graphic design 
 Wilfredo Lam – cover artwork

Studios
 Recorded at Schnee Studios (North Hollywood, California).
 Post-Production Engineering at The Review Room (New York City, New York).
 Mastered at Precision Lacquer (Los Angeles, California).

References

1991 albums
Yellowjackets albums
GRP Records albums
Instrumental albums